Dharamshala (also spelled Dharamsala) is the winter capital of Himachal Pradesh, India.

The city has been selected as one of a hundred in India to be developed as a smart city under Indian Prime Minister Narendra Modi's flagship "Smart Cities Mission". On 19 January 2017, the Chief Minister of Himachal Pradesh, Virbhadra Singh, declared Dharamshala as the second capital of Himachal Pradesh, making it the third national administrative division of India to have two capitals after the state of Maharashtra and the union territory of Jammu and Kashmir.

Description
Dharamshala is a municipal corporation city in the upper reaches of the Kangra Valley and is surrounded by dense coniferous forest consisting mainly of stately Deodar cedar trees. The suburbs include McLeod Ganj, Bhagsunag, Dharamkot, Naddi, Forsyth Ganj, Kotwali Bazar (the main market), Kaccheri Adda (government offices such as the court, police, post, etc.), Dari, Ramnagar, Sidhpur, and Sidhbari (where the Karmapa is based). This place is also famous for its Himachal Pradesh Cricket Association Stadium (2003), which offers opportunities to the youth of state to prepare for their future in the game. McLeod Ganj town, lying in the upper reaches, is known worldwide for being the home of the Dalai Lama. On 29 April 1959, the 14th Dalai Lama (Tenzin Gyatso) established the Tibetan exile administration in the north Indian hill station of Mussoorie. In May 1960, the Central Tibetan Administration (CTA) was moved to Dharamshala, making it the centre of the Tibetan exile world in India. Following the 1959 Tibetan uprising there was an influx of Tibetan refugees who followed the 14th Dalai Lama. His presence and the Tibetan population have made Dharamshala a destination for Indian and foreign tourists, including students studying Tibet.

Although the majority of tea gardens in Kangra District are located in and around Palampur, Dharamshala also has several tea gardens which are prominently situated around Sheela Chowk and extend northwards to Khaniyara. The other tea gardens are at Kunal Pathri. The tea is known as Dharamsala or Kangra tea, and is very popular across India and the rest of the world. Traditionally known for Kangra green tea, Dharamshala now produces all teas including black tea, green tea, oolong tea and white teas, in addition to the popular Kashmiri Kahwa and Masala Chai.

Etymology
Dharamshala (Devanagari: धर्मशाला; ITRANS: Dharmashala; IAST: Dharmaśālā) is a Hindi word (derived from Sanskrit) that is a compound of dharma (धर्म) and shālā (शाला). Literally, "House or place of Dharma".

In common Hindi usage, the word dharamshala refers to a shelter or rest house for spiritual pilgrims. Traditionally, such dharamshalas (pilgrims' rest houses) were commonly constructed near pilgrimage destinations (often in remote areas) to give visitors a place to sleep for the night. When the first permanent settlement was created in the place now called Dharamshala, there was one such pilgrims' rest house on the site, and the settlement took its name from that Dharamshala.

History

Before the British Raj
Before the British Raj, Dharamshala and its surrounding area was under the Sikh Empire of Lahore. Under the British Raj, the regions were part of undivided province of Punjab, and was ruled by the governors of Punjab from Lahore. The Katoch dynasty that earlier ruled this region had been reduced to status of jagirdars (of Kangra-Lambagraon) under the Treaty of Jawalamukhi, signed in 1810 between Sansar Chand Katoch and Maharaja Ranjit Singh of the Sikh Empire. The indigenous people of the Dharamshala area (and the surrounding region) are the Gaddis, a predominantly Hindu group who traditionally lived a nomadic or semi-nomadic transhumant lifestyle. Due to the lack of permanent settlements in the area, some Gaddis lost their seasonal pastures and farmland when the British and the Gurkhas arrived to settle.

Settlement by the British and the Gurkhas

In 1848, the area now known as Dharamshala was annexed by the British.

"Dharamsāla lies on a spur of the Dhola Dhār, 16 miles north-east of Kāngra, in the midst of wild and picturesque scenery. It originally formed a subsidiary cantonment for the troops stationed at Kāngra, and was first occupied as a station in 1849, when a site was required for a cantonment to accommodate a Native regiment which was being raised in the District. A site was found upon the slopes of the Dhola Dhār, in a plot of waste land, upon which stood an old Hindu resthouse, or dharmsāla, whence the name adopted for the new cantonment. The civil authorities, following the example of the regimental officers, and attracted by the advantages of climate and scenery, built themselves houses in the neighbourhood of the cantonment; and in 1855 the new station was formally recognised as the headquarters of the Kāngra District."

In 1860, the 66th Gurkha Light Infantry was moved from Kangra, Himachal Pradesh to Dharamshala, which was at first made a subsidiary cantonment. An ideal position for the new base was found on the slopes of the Dhauladhar Hills, near the site of a Hindu sanctuary, or Dharamshala, hence the name of the town. The Battalion was later renamed the historic 1st Gurkha Rifles, this was the beginning of the legend of the Gurkhas, also known as the 'Bravest of the Brave'. Consequently, fourteen Gurkha platoon villages grew from this settlement, and exist to this day, namely Dari, Ramnagar, Shyamnagar, Dal, Totarani, Khanyara, Sadher, Chaandmaari, Sallagarhi, Sidhbari, Yol, and so on. The Gurkhas worshipped at the ancient Shiva temple of Bhagsunag. The Gurkhas referred to Dharamshala as 'Bhagsu' and referred to themselves as Bhagsuwalas.

The 21st Gurkha Regiment from Dharamshala performed heroic feats during World War I and the North West Frontier Province campaigns. The Gurkha cantonment then reached its zenith during World War II, when battalions from Dharamshala made history. Many place names in the town still retain their former cantonment terminologies: Depot Bazaar, Pensioners' Lines, Tirah Lines (named after the 19th century Tirah Campaign), Bharatpore Lines (named after the 1826 Battle of Bharatpore).

The eighth earl Lord Elgin, Viceroy of India died here (at the 1st Gurkha Rifles Officers' Mess) in 1863 and is buried in the cemetery of St. John in the Wilderness, a small Anglican church distinguished by its stained-glass windows. Dharamshala became a popular hill station for the British working in or near Delhi, offering a cool respite during the hot summer months.

"Before the earthquake of 1905, the upper part of the station, which rises to a height of 7,112 feet [2,168 metres], contained the European houses, the station church, and the officers' mess and lines of the 1st Gurkhas, together with the public gardens, post office, and two bazars, the Forsyth Ganj and McLeod Ganj. The public offices, a bazar, and a few European houses made up the lower station, as low as 4,500 feet [1,372 metres]. The 1st battalion of the 1st Gurkhas used to be stationed here, but was moved to the upper station in 1894-5.... The public gardens, which were, before the earthquake, laid out with much taste in lawns and terraces, contained a valuable collection of indigenous and imported trees and shrubs, and were overlooked by the Assembly Rooms, a handsome building comprising a public hall, a library and reading-room and a billiard-room. The church was beautifully situated in a recess of the mountain."

In 1905, the Kangra valley suffered a major earthquake. On 4 April of that year, the earth shook, demolishing much of the cantonment and the neighbouring city of Kangra, Himachal Pradesh as well as the Bhagsunag temple. Altogether, the 1905 Kangra earthquake killed 20,000 people. "1,625 persons perished at Dharamsāla alone, including 15 Europeans and 112 of the Gurkha garrison."

The Gurkhas rebuilt the town along with the temple, which today is acknowledged as the 1st Gurkha Rifles' heritage. The British had planned to make Dharamshala the summer capital of India, but moved to Shimla after the disaster.

Not only did the Gurkhas of Dharmshala make a major contribution to India's defence, many were freedom fighters for the Indian National Army, which had been founded by Netaji Subhas Chandra Bose. The Indian National Army Captain Ram Singh Thakur, a Gurkha from the village of Khanyara, composed some of India's most popular and stirring patriotic songs, including "Kadam Kadam Badaye Ja". He is acknowledged so by the Netaji Research Bureau, Kolkata. The important contribution of the noted Gurkha social commentator, the late Master Mitrasen Thapa, from the village of Totarani, has been acknowledged by the Himachal Pradesh government. Recently, a park dedicated to the memory of the late Brigadier Sher Jung Thapa, MVC, the 'Hero of Skardu', has been opened alongside the road between Lower and Upper Dharamshala.

Establishment of Tibetan exile community

The Tibetan settlement of Dharamshala began in 1959, when the Dalai Lama had to flee Tibet and Jawaharlal Nehru, the then Prime Minister of India allowed him and his followers to settle in McLeod Ganj, a former colonial British summer picnic spot 10 kilometers to the north of Dharamshala. "Nehru was delighted with the 'forgotten ghost-town wasting in the woods', and offered it to the Dalai Lama." There they established the "government-in-exile" in 1960 and the Namgyal Monastery. Dharamshala had been connected with Hinduism and Buddhism for a long time, many monasteries having been established there in the past, by Tibetan immigrants in the 19th century.

In 1970, Tenzin Gyatso, the 14th Dalai Lama opened the Library of Tibetan Works and Archives which houses over 80,000 manuscripts and other important resources related to Tibetan history, politics and culture. It is considered one of the most important institutions for Tibetology in the world; the new director is Geshe Lahkdor, the old translator of the Dalai Lama.

Today

Several thousand Tibetan exiles have now settled in the area; most live in and around McLeod Ganj in Upper Dharamshala, where they have built monasteries, temples and schools. It has become an important tourist destination with many hotels and restaurants, leading to growth in tourism and commerce.

Dharamshala is the winter capital of Himachal Pradesh. The Legislative Assembly is at Sidhbari, near the Chinmaya Tapovan Ashram, and the winter sessions of the government are held there. Dharamshala is also a famous bird-watching spot in India.

Transcription and pronunciation

Due to a lack of uniform observance of transliteration and transcription conventions for Hindi (and the Devanagari script in which Hindi is written), the name of the town has been transcribed into English (and other languages using Romanic scripts) variously as Dharamshala, Dharamsala and, less frequently, Dharmshala and Dharmsala. These four permutations result from two variables: the transcription of the word धर्म (dharma)—particularly the second syllable (र्म)—and that of the third syllable (शा).

A strict transliteration of धर्म as written would be 'dharma' . Thus, if the goal of the transcription is phonetic accord with modern spoken Hindi, then 'dharam' and 'dharm' are both legitimate options. Regarding the third syllable, the Devanagari श corresponds to the English sh sound, . Thus शाला is transcribed in English as 'shala'.

Therefore, the most accurate phonetic transcription of the Hindi धर्मशाला into Roman script for common (non-technical) English usage is either 'Dharamshala' or, less commonly, 'Dharmshala', both of which render the sh sound of श in English as 'sh' to convey the correct native pronunciation, 'Dharamshala'  or 'Dharmshala' ). Nonetheless, the alternate spelling 'Dharamsala' continues to be used in some cases despite its inaccuracy, and all four spelling permutations can be found in the English language materials of the local and state governments, in publications, and on the Internet. Regardless of spelling variations, the correct native pronunciation is with the sh sound. In actual practice, the spelling variant that is most common and most concordant with standards of transcription and native pronunciation is 'Dharamshala'. The official Indian English spelling is 'Dharamshala'.

Geography

Dharamsala is located in the Kangra Valley, in the shadow of the Dhauladhar mountains.

The city is divided into two distinct sections. Kotwali Bazaar and the surrounding markets are referred to as "Lower Dharamshala" or just "Dharamshala." Further up the mountain is McLeod Ganj. A steep, narrow road connects McLeod Ganj from Dharamshala and is only accessible to taxis and small cars, while a longer road winds around the valley for use by buses and trucks. McLeod Ganj is surrounded by pine, Himalayan oak, and rhododendron.

Climate

Dharamshala has a monsoon influenced, humid subtropical climate (Köppen: Cwa). Summer starts in early April and peaks in May when temperatures can reach , and lasts until the start of June. From June to mid-September is the monsoon season, when up to 3,000 mm (120 inches) of rainfall can be experienced, making Dharamshala one of the wettest places in the state. Autumn is mild and lasts from October to the end of November.

Winter starts in December and continues until late February. Snow and sleet are common during the winter in upper Dharamshala (including McLeodganj, Bhagsu Nag and Naddi). Lower Dharamshala receives little frozen precipitation except hail. The snowfall of 7 January 2012 was heaviest recorded in recent times. It was caused by deep low pressure entering the Kangra district. Winter is followed by a short, pleasant spring until April. Historically, the Dhauladhar mountains used to remain snow-covered all year long; however, in recent years they have been losing their snow blanket during dry spells.

Demographics

As of the 2001 India census, Dharamshala had a population of 30,764. As per the 2015, it has a population of 53,543 Since its area increased as it became Municipal corporation. Males constitute 55% of the population and females 45%. Dharamshala has an average literacy rate of 87%, higher than the national average of 74.04%: male literacy is 90% and female literacy is 83%. In Dharamshala, 9% of the population is under 6 years of age.

As of Census of India 2011 and Municipal corporation 2015:
	
Number of Households – 10,992
Average Household Size (per household) – 4.0
Population-Total – 53,543
Population-Urban – 53,543
Proportion of Urban Population (%) – 100
Population-Rural – 0
Sex Ratio – 941
Population (0–6 years) – 1,819
Sex Ratio (0–6 years) – 913
SC Population – 2,611
Sex Ratio (SC) – 861
Proportion of SC (%) – 14.0
ST Population – 99
Sex Ratio (ST) – 833
Proportion of ST (%) – 1
Literacy Rate (%) – 87.0
The languages residents of Dharamsala most commonly speak are Gaadi, Kangri, Hindi, English, Tibetan, Nepali and Pahari.

Government and politics
Dharamshala was upgraded from a Municipal Council to a Corporation in 2015. It has 17 wards under its jurisdiction. Onkar Singh Nehria is currently serving  as the Mayor of the town unanimously.

Economy
The main crops grown in the valleys below are rice, wheat and tea.

Dharamshala also has lush tea gardens that produce its popular Kangra tea. Traditionally known for Kangra green tea, Dharamshala now produces a variety of teas, including black, green, oolong and white teas, along with Kashmiri Kahwa and Masala Chai. Tea gardens at Mann Tea Estate are owned and operated by the Dharmsala Tea Company, which conducts guided tours of the tea gardens and factory, and offers tea tastings. Kangra green tea is considered to be among the best in India, and has also been found to contain the highest anti-oxidant levels of all green teas produced in India.

Shopping and entertainment
The city is divided into two distinct sections. Kotwali Bazaar and the surrounding markets are referred to as "Lower Dharamshala" or just "Dharamshala" and upper Dharamshala or places such as McLeodganj, Dharamkot, etc.

In the city of Dharamshala, Maximus Mall and Gold Multiplex Cinema are open now on the National Highway Road in the Chilgari area, near Kotwali Bazaar and the main bus stand in Lower Dharamshala, in addition to the traditional shopping street called as Kotwali Bazaar. Maximus mall is the second biggest mall in the state after Purnam Mall, Bilaspur. It has CCD, KFC, Pizza Hut, Kapsons, Moti Mahal Restaurant, Sketchers, Aurelia, Baskin Robins and many reputed international brands. Another mall The Hillside Mall is situated in the Kotwali that includes a Domino's Pizza Restaurant.

Further, Dharamshala Skyway, a mountain Cable Car between the cities of Dharamshala and McLeod Ganj has become operational from 19th Jan 2022.

Cityscape

Major suburbs

Bhagsunag
Cheelgari
Triund Trekking Point
Naddi
Dal Lake
Dari
Barol
Kachehri Adda
Khaniyara
Kotwali Bazar
Mant Khas
McLeod Ganj
Upper Sakoh & Lower Sakoh 
Khel Parisar
Sidhbari
Sheela Chowk
Yol
Jama Masjid Dharamshala
Tea Garden Cheelgari
Aganjer Mahadev Temple
War Memorial Museum
Ram Nagar
Shyam Nagar

Rural areas
Sudher
Gharoh
Dhanotu
Chari
Sarah

Trekking

Dharamshala is a starting point to a number of trekking trails that especially includes lead trekkers across Dhauladhar into the upper Ravi Valley and Chamba district. En route, trekkers cross through forests of deodar, pine, oak and rhododendron, and pass streams and rivers and wind along vertiginous cliff tracks, and the occasional lake waterfall and glacier.

A two-kilometer amble takes one to Bhagsu, and then a further three-kilometer walk will lead the trekkers to Dharamkot. If one wishes to go on a longer walk then he/she can trek eight-kilometers to Triund. The snow line of Ilaqa Got is just a five-kilometer walk.

Other trekking trails that lead trekkers to Chamba from Dharamshala are:

Toral Pass (4575m) which begins from Tang Narwana (1150m) that is nearly 10 km from Dharamshala
Across Bhimghasutri Pass (4580m) via near-vertical rocky ascents, steep cliffs and dangerous gorges. This is a highly difficult level trek and takes around six days to complete.
Dharamshala—Bleni Pass (3710m) – Dunali. Compared to other trekking trails, this one is much easier and takes around four or five-days to complete. The trek leads through alpine pastures, woods, and streams, before ending at Dunali, on the Chamba road.
Dharamshala is an ideal destination for rock climbing enthusiasts. One can go rock climbing over the ridges of the Dhauladhar range.
Kareri Lake (near Kareri village) is also a famous trekking destination for travellers.
Triund-Thatri-Trek (TTT) a circular trek for two nights and three days around Dharamshala. The first day involves walking up to Triund and staying for a night, and the second day walk to a village called Thatri and stay overnight at Camp Himalayan Nest. The third day after walking for couple of hours, walkers reach to broadhead near Dharamshala.

Dharamshala International Film Festival

DIFF was established in 2012. It is presented by White Crane Arts & Media trust, established by filmmakers Ritu Sarin and Tenzing Sonam to promote contemporary art, cinema and independent media practices in the Himalayan region.

Transport

Road
Buses of all classes (deluxe, air-conditioned, and regular) ply daily between Dharamshala and major cities such as Chandigarh, Delhi, and Shimla through NH 154 and NH 503.

Air
Dharamshala town is reached by Gaggal Airport codes|DHM|VIGG, about 12 km to the town's south and about 10 km north of Kangra town.

Rail
Pathankot, some 90 km away, is the nearest broad gauge railway head. The Kangra Valley Railway, a narrow gauge railway line connecting Pathankot to Jogindernagar, can also be used to reach the town via rail. This line is well-known for picturesque views of the Kangra valley from it. The nearest station to Dharamshala on this line is Chamunda Marg, located about 22 km southeast.

Taxi
To Exlpore Dharamshala and Mcleodganj Town by taxi & cab service, There is Two registered Taxi union and One online working company with the name of "HIMALAYA CAB" Registered with Himachal Pradesh Tourism in Dharamshala city.

Ropeway
A 1.8 km long ropeway called Dharamshala Skyway connecting Dharamshala and Mcleodganj via cable car was inaugurated in January 2022.

Educational institutions

Central University of Himachal Pradesh, Kangra
Government College of Teacher Education Dharamsala
Himachal Pradesh University
International Sahaja Public School
Maulana Abul Kalam Azad memorial Library at Jama Masjid Dharamshala

Sports

Dharamshala International Cricket Stadium
Himachal Pradesh Cricket Association Stadium (HPCAS) is a cricket stadium of international reputation, which serves as the home ground to the Himachal Pradesh state cricket team and for the IPL team Kings XI Punjab to a limited extent. By virtue of its natural backdrop, it is one of the most attractive cricket stadiums in the world. It is also one of the highest altitude Cricket Stadiums in the world. In addition to Ranji matches, some international matches are held here. The HPCA International Cricket Stadium is located near the Government Degree College, Dharmashala. The first One day International held at the ground was played between India and England on Sunday, 27 January 2013 which England won by 7 wickets. In May 2011, a match between Kings XI Punjab and Chennai Superkings was held here which was attended by the Dalai Lama.

The snow-capped mountains can be easily viewed throughout the year. An additional feature is the Dharamshala College nearby which is surrounded by pine trees on one side.

Notable residents
Mehr Chand Mahajan (1889–1967) from Dharamshala was the third Chief Justice of India and 1st Prime Minister of J&K 
Tenzin Gyatso, HH The 14th Dalai Lama
James Bruce, 8th Earl of Elgin, died here.
Alfred W. Hallett, artist who exhibited twice in Royal Academy of Arts London and lived 41 years at Dharamkot in upper Dharamshala; died here in 1986.
Kishan Kapoor, Member of Parliament, Kangra. 
Purva Rana, Vice Queen at Miss United Continent, 2013
Sheetal Thakur, Indian model and actor.
 Asif Basra, died here 12 november 2020

Notable organisations
Tibetan Centre for Human Rights and Democracy
Central Tibetan Administration

Bibliography
Verma, V. 1996. Gaddis of Dhauladhar: A Transhumant Tribe of the Himalayas. Indus Publishing Co., New Delhi.
Handa, O. C. 1987. Buddhist Monasteries in Himachal Pradesh. Indus Publishing Co., New Delhi..

See also
Hari Kothi, a historic property in Dharamshala

References

External links
"India's Female Traffic Police," filmed in Dharamshala, 2018

 
1849 establishments in British India
Cities and towns in Kangra district
Hill stations in Himachal Pradesh
Populated places established in 1849
Tibetan Buddhist places
Tibetan diaspora in India
Smart cities in India